Lauren Baldwin may refer to:

 Lauren Anne Baldwin, English actor
 Lauren Fenmore Baldwin, fictional character in The Young and the Restless